Olga Glaz (born 25 April 1975) is a Russian weightlifter.
She competed at the 1996 World Weightlifting Championships. 1999 World Weightlifting Championships, and 2001 World Weightlifting Championships.

References 

Living people
1975 births

Russian female weightlifters